The PMPC Star Award for Best Drama Actor and Actress is given to the best actors and actresses in a television drama of the year.

Winners

Multiple awards for Best Actor

Multiple awards for Best Drama Actress

PMPC Star Awards for Television